The 2012–13 Detroit Pistons season was the 72nd season of the franchise, the 65th in the National Basketball Association (NBA), and the 56th in Detroit.

Draft picks

 Pick acquired from the Houston Rockets on June 25, 2009 in exchange for the draft rights to Chase Budinger.

Roster

Pre-season

|- style="background:#cfc;"
| 1
| October 10
| Toronto
| 
| Greg Monroe (17)
| Greg Monroe (10)
| Will Bynum (7)
| The Palace of Auburn Hills9,532
| 1–0
|- style="background:#fcc;"
| 2
| October 12
| @ Toronto
| 
| Rodney Stuckey (14)
| Austin Daye (9)
| Brandon Knight (5)
| Air Canada Centre10,167
| 1–1
|- style="background:#fcc;"
| 3
| October 13
| @ Milwaukee
| 
| Andre Drummond (19)
| Andre Drummond (10)
| Brandon Knight (8)
| BMO Harris Bradley Center5,213
| 1–2
|- style="background:#cfc;"
| 4
| October 16
| Orlando
| 
| Rodney Stuckey (19)
| Jason Maxiell (8)
| Rodney Stuckey (5)
| The Palace of Auburn Hills9,229
| 2–2
|- style="background:#fcc;"
| 5
| October 18
| @ Miami
| 
| Greg Monroe (15)
| Andre Drummond (8)
| Brandon Knight (4)
| American Airlines Arena19,600
| 2–3
|- style="background:#cfc;"
| 6
| October 20
| Charlotte
| 
| Rodney Stuckey (16)
| Andre Drummond,Greg Monroe (7)
| Greg Monroe,Rodney Stuckey (4)
| The Palace of Auburn Hills9,923
| 3–3
|- style="background:#fcc;"
| 7
| October 24
| @ Minnesota
| 
| Rodney Stuckey (21)
| Brandon Knight (6)
| Brandon Knight (3)
| MTS Centre12,163
| 3–4
|- style="background:#cfc;"
| 8
| October 26
| Atlanta
| 
| Brandon Knight, Greg Monroe (16)
| Greg Monroe (11)
| Will Bynum (7)
| The Palace of Auburn Hills10,825
| 4–4

Regular season

Game log

|- style="background:#fcc;"
| 1 || October 31 || Houston
| 
| Brandon Knight (15)
| Maxiell & Monroe (8)
| Rodney Stuckey (6)
| The Palace of Auburn Hills16,646
| 0–1
						
|- style="background:#fcc;"
| 2 || November 2 || @ Phoenix	
| 
| Tayshaun Prince (18)
| Andre Drummond (8)
| Brandon Knight (10)
| US Airways Center15,107
| 0–2							
|- style="background:#fcc;"							
| 3 || November 4 || @ L. A. Lakers
| 
| Jonas Jerebko (18)
| Drummond & Monroe (7)
| Brandon Knight (6)
| Staples Center18,997
| 0-3								
|- style="background:#fcc;"								
| 4 || November 6 || @ Denver
| 
| Greg Monroe (27)
| Greg Monroe (10)
| Brandon Knight (9)
| Pepsi Center19,155
| 0-4								
|- style="background:#fcc;"								
| 5 || November 7 || @ Sacramento
| 
| Monroe & Knight (21)
| Greg Monroe (12)
| Greg Monroe (11)
| Power Balance Pavilion10,185
| 0-5							
|- style="background:#fcc;"								
| 6 || November 9 || @ Oklahoma City
| 
| Andre Drummond (22)
| Greg Monroe (10)
| Monroe, Knight & Stuckey (6)
| Chesapeake Energy Arena18,203
| 0-6								
|- style="background:#fcc;"								
| 7 || November 10 || @ Houston	
| 
| Brandon Knight (16)
| Greg Monroe (11)
| Brandon Knight (7)
| Toyota Center15,037
| 0-7								
|- style="background:#fcc;"							
| 8 || November 12 || Oklahoma City
| 
| Rodney Stuckey (19)
| Jason Maxiell (7)
| Brandon Knight (6)
| The Palace of Auburn Hills12,784
| 0-8								
|- style="background:#cfc;"								
| 9 || November 14 || @ Philadelphia
| 
| Greg Monroe (19)
| Greg Monroe (18)
| Brandon Knight (7)
| Wells Fargo Center11,879
| 1-8								
|- style="background:#fcc;"								
| 10 || November 16 || Orlando	
| 
| Greg Monroe (23)
| Greg Monroe (7)
| Brandon Knight (12)
| The Palace of Auburn Hills11,594
| 1-9								
|- style="background:#cfc;"							
| 11 || November 18 || Boston
| 
| Greg Monroe (20)
| Greg Monroe (13)
| Bynum & Stuckey (5)
| The Palace of Auburn Hills12,214
| 2-9								
|- style="background:#fcc;"								
| 12 || November 21 || @ Orlando
| 
| Greg Monroe (19)
| Monroe & Prince (8)
| Brandon Knight (5)
| Amway Center17,199
| 2-10								
|- style="background:#cfc;"								
| 13 || November 23 || Toronto
| 
| Greg Monroe (19)
| Andre Drummond (13)
| Greg Monroe (5)
| The Palace of Auburn Hills12,778
| 3-10								
|- style="background:#fcc;"								
| 14 || November 25 || @ New York
| 
| Brandon Knight (21)
| Andre Drummond (11)
| Greg Monroe (7)
| Madison Square Garden19,033
| 3-11								
|- style="background:#cfc;"								
| 15 || November 26 || Portland
| 
| Brandon Knight (26)
| Monroe & Singler(10)
| Kyle Singler (5)
| The Palace of Auburn Hills10,212
| 4-11								
|- style="background:#cfc;"							
| 16 || November 28 || Phoenix		
| 
| Knight & Villanueva (19)
| Andre Drummond (9)
| Brandon Knight (6)	
| The Palace of Auburn Hills10,517
| 5-11								
|- style="background:#fcc;"					
| 17 || November 30 || @ Memphis
| 
| Greg Monroe (17)
| Monroe & Maxiell (9)
| Tayshaun Prince (4)
| FedExForum16,732
| 5-12			
					
|- style="background:#fcc;"												
| 18 || December 1 || @ Dallas
| 
| Brandon Knight (20)
| Greg Monroe (15)
| Rodney Stuckey (6)
| American Airlines Center20,285
| 5-13								
|- style="background:#cfc;"							
| 19 || December 3 || Cleveland
| 
| Brandon Knight (17)
| Greg Monroe (14)
| Rodney Stuckey (6)
| The Palace of Auburn Hills11,352
| 6-13								
|- style="background:#fcc;"								
| 20 || December 5 || Golden State
| 
| Tayshaun Prince (24)
| Andre Drummond (12)
| Rodney Stuckey (9)
| The Palace of Auburn Hills11,128
| 6-14								
|- style="background:#fcc;"								
| 21 || December 7 || Chicago		
| 
| Rodney Stuckey (24)
| Jason Maxiell (9)
| Rodney Stuckey (7)
| The Palace of Auburn Hills17,142
| 6-15								
|- style="background:#cfc;"					
| 22 || December 8 || @ Cleveland
| 
| Brandon Knight (30)
| Tayshaun Prince (8)
| Rodney Stuckey (6)
| Quicken Loans Arena16,062
| 7-15								
|- style="background:#fcc;"							
| 23 || December 10 || @ Philadelphia	
| 
| Monroe & Knight (22)
| Jason Maxiell (11)
| Rodney Stuckey (5)
| Wells Fargo Center15,225
| 7-16							
|- style="background:#fcc;"						
| 24 || December 11 || Denver
| 
| Brandon Knight (20)
| Greg Monroe (12)
| Brandon Knight (5)
| The Palace of Auburn Hills10,265
| 7-17								
|- style="background:#fcc;"							
| 25 || December 14 || @ Brooklyn
| 
| Brandon Knight (22)
| Tayshaun Prince (10)
| Tayshaun Prince (6)
| Barclays Center15,797
| 7-18								
|- style="background:#fcc;"								
| 26 || December 15 || Indiana
| 
| Greg Monroe (18)
| Andre Drummond (9)
| Rodney Stuckey (7)
| The Palace of Auburn Hills13,235
| 7-19								
|- style="background:#fcc;"							
| 27 || December 17 || L. A. Clippers
| 
| Brandon Knight (16)
| Monroe & Prince (7)
| Greg Monroe (6)
| The Palace of Auburn Hills13,560
| 7-20								
|- style="background:#fcc;"								
| 28 || December 19 || @ Toronto
| 
| Greg Monroe (35)
| Greg Monroe (10)
| Brandon Knight (6)
| Air Canada Centre17,062
| 7-21								
|- style="background:#cfc;"								
| 29 || December 21 || Washington
| 
| Monroe & Knight (15)
| Andre Drummond (14)
| Rodney Stuckey (5)
| The Palace of Auburn Hills13,489
| 8-21								
|- style="background:#cfc;"							
| 30 || December 22 || @ Washington
| 
| Charlie Villanueva (19)
| Andre Drummond (11)
| Rodney Stuckey (8)
| Verizon Center13,104
| 9-21								
|- style="background:#fcc;"								
| 31 || December 26 || @ Atlanta
| 
| Will Bynum (31)
| Andre Drummond (12)
| Rodney Stuckey (11)
| Philips Arena15,182
| 9-22								
|- style="background:#cfc;"							
| 32 || December 28 || Miami
| 
| Will Bynum (25)
| Andre Drummond (10)
| Will Bynum (10)
| The Palace of Auburn Hills22,076
| 10-22								
|- style="background:#cfc;"							
| 33 || December 30 || Milwaukee
| 
| Tayshaun Prince (20)
| Monroe & Maxiell (10)
| Will Bynum (5)
| The Palace of Auburn Hills14,219
| 11-22					
			
|- style="background:#cfc;"								
| 34 || January 1 || Sacramento
| 
| Brandon Knight (20)
| Greg Monroe (11)
| Knight & Bynum (4)
| The Palace of Auburn Hills12,175
| 12-22								
|- style="background:#cfc;"							
| 35 || January 4 || Atlanta	
| 
| Austin Daye (20)
| Jason Maxiell (10)
| Will Bynum (5)
| The Palace of Auburn Hills14,832
| 13-22								
|- style="background:#fcc;"						
| 36 || January 6 || Charlotte
| 
| Tayshaun Prince (21)
| Greg Monroe (14)
| Will Bynum (9)
| The Palace of Auburn Hills11,963
| 13-23								
|- style="background:#cfc;"								
| 37 || January 11 || @ Milwaukee
| 
| Greg Monroe (26)
| Monroe & Drummond (11)
| Brandon Knight (5)
| BMO Harris Bradley Center15,681
| 14-23								
|- style="background:#fcc;"								
| 38 || January 12 || Utah	
| 
| Brandon Knight (16)
| Greg Monroe (11)
| Will Bynum (4)
| The Palace of Auburn Hills18,441
| 14-24								
|- style="background:#fcc;"						
| 39 || January 17 || New York
| 
| Will Bynum (22)
| Monroe & Drummond (10)
| Greg Monroe (5)
| The O2 Arena18,689
| 14-25								
|- style="background:#cfc;"							
| 40 || January 20 || Boston
| 
| Andre Drummond (16)
| Greg Monroe (11)
| Monroe, Singler, Knight & Bynum (5)
| The Palace of Auburn Hills17,575
| 15-25								
|- style="background:#cfc;"							
| 41 || January 22 || Orlando	
| 
| Brandon Knight (18)
| Maxiell & Drummond (11)
| Will Bynum (6)
| The Palace of Auburn Hills11,798
| 16-25								
|- style="background:#fcc;"						
| 42 || January 23 || @ Chicago
| 
| Brandon Knight (13)
| Jason Maxiell (11)
| Brandon Knight (7)
| United Center21,567
| 16-26								
|- style="background:#fcc;"								
| 43 || January 25 || @ Miami	
| 
| Greg Monroe (31)
| Greg Monroe (12)
| Brandon Knight (5)
| American Airlines Arena20,236
| 16-27								
|- style="background:#cfc;"							
| 44 || January 27 || @ Orlando
| 
| Brandon Knight (31)
| Greg Monroe (7)
| Greg Monroe (6)
| Amway Center17,959
| 17-27								
|- style="background:#fcc;"								
| 45 || January 29 || Milwaukee
| 
| Andre Drummond (18)
| Andre Drummond (18)
| Greg Monroe (4)
| The Palace of Auburn Hills15,479
| 17-28								
|- style="background:#fcc;"								
| 46 || January 30 || @ Indiana
| 
| Greg Monroe (18)
| Andre Drummond (14)
| Brandon Knight (4)
| Bankers Life Fieldhouse12,137
| 17-29
						
|- style="background:#cfc;"							
| 47 || February 1 || Cleveland
| 
| Knight & Singler (20)
| Greg Monroe (16)
| Brandon Knight (10)
| The Palace of Auburn Hills15,693
| 18-29								
|- style="background:#fcc;"							
| 48 || February 3 || L. A. Lakers
| 
| Greg Monroe (20)
| Greg Monroe (12)
| Will Bynum (10)
| The Palace of Auburn Hills18,157
| 18-30								
|- style="background:#fcc;"							
| 49 || February 4 || @ New York
| 
| José Calderón (15)
| Greg Monroe (10)
| Rodney Stuckey (4)
| Madison Square Garden19,033
| 18-31								
|- style="background:#fcc;"							
| 50 || February 6 || Brooklyn	
| 
| Greg Monroe (23)
| Greg Monroe (10)
| José Calderón (9)
| The Palace of Auburn Hills12,576
| 18-32								
|- style="background:#cfc;"						
| 51 || February 8 || San Antonio
| 
| Greg Monroe (26)
| Greg Monroe (16)
| José Calderón (8)
| The Palace of Auburn Hills16,267
| 19-32								
|- style="background:#cfc;"							
| 52 || February 9 || @ Milwaukee
| 
| José Calderón (23)
| Greg Monroe (13)
| José Calderón (10)
| BMO Harris Bradley Center15,511
| 20-32								
|- style="background:#fcc;"							
| 53 || February 11 || New Orleans
| 
| Rodney Stuckey (19)
| Greg Monroe (11)
| José Calderón (9)
| The Palace of Auburn Hills10,177
| 20-33								
|- style="background:#cfc;"								
| 54 || February 13 || Washington
| 
| José Calderón (24)
| Greg Monroe (18)
| Will Bynum (8)
| The Palace of Auburn Hills11,095
| 21-33
|- align="center"
|colspan="9" bgcolor="#bbcaff"|All-Star Break
|- style="background:#fcc;"							
| 55 || February 19 || Memphis
| 
| Knight & Jerebko (13)
| Greg Monroe (6)
| José Calderón (7)
| The Palace of Auburn Hills13,481
| 21-34								
|- style="background:#cfc;"							
| 56 || February 20 || @ Charlotte
| 
| Brandon Knight (21)
| Charlie Villanueva (9)
| Monroe & Bynum (7)
| Time Warner Cable Arena13,112
| 22-34								
|- style="background:#fcc;"								
| 57 || February 22 || @ Indiana
| 
| Will Bynum (17)
| Viacheslav Kravtsov (10)
| Will Bynum (4)
| Bankers Life Fieldhouse17,750
| 22-35								
|- style="background:#fcc;"							
| 58 || February 23 || Indiana
| 
| Will Bynum (15)
| Greg Monroe (12)
| José Calderón (5)
| The Palace of Auburn Hills17,509
| 22-36		
|- style="background:#fcc;"								
| 59 || February 25 || Atlanta	
| 
| Rodney Stuckey (22)
| Greg Monroe (8)
| José Calderón (9)
| The Palace of Auburn Hills12,407
|22-37						
|- style="background:#cfc;"						
| 60 || February 27 || @ Washington
|  
| Brandon Knight (32)
| Greg Monroe (11)
| José Calderón (18)
| Verizon Center14,298 
| 23-37		
			
|- style="background:#fcc;"							
| 61 || March 1 || @ New Orleans
|  
| Greg Monroe (27)
| Greg Monroe (10)
| José Calderón (11)
| New Orleans Arena14,189 
| 23-38	
|- style="background:#fcc;"								
| 62 || March 3 || @ San Antonio
|  
| Greg Monroe (16)
| Charlie Villanueva (10)
| Brandon Knight (6)
| AT&T Center18,581 
| 23-39
|- style="background:#fcc;"							
| 63 || March 6 || New York
| 
| Brandon Knight (17)
| Jason Maxiell (9)
| José Calderón (16)
| The Palace of Auburn Hills16,181 
| 23-40
|- style="background:#fcc;"							
| 64 || March 8 || Dallas
|  
| Brandon Knight (21)
| Jason Maxiell (13)
| José Calderón (7)
| The Palace of Auburn Hills19,504 
| 23-41
|- style="background:#fcc;"							
| 65 || March 10 || @ L. A. Clippers
| 
| José Calderón (18)
| Jonas Jerebko (8)
| Rodney Stuckey (5)
| Staples Center19,344 
| 23-42
|- style="background:#fcc;"							
| 66 || March 11 || @ Utah	
| 
| Jonas Jerebko (15)
| Greg Monroe (13)
| José Calderón (7)
| EnergySolutions Arena18,568 
| 23-43
|- style="background:#fcc;"							
| 67 || March 13 || @ Golden State	
|  
| Rodney Stuckey (22)
| Jason Maxiell (14)
| José Calderón (6)
| Oracle Arena19,596 
| 23-44
|- style="background:#fcc;"							
| 68 || March 16 || @ Portland			
|  
| Rodney Stuckey (32)
| Greg Monroe (9)
| Greg Monroe (6)
| Rose Garden20,161 
| 23-45
|- style="background:#fcc;"					
| 69 || March 18 || Brooklyn	
|  
| Will Bynum (18)
| Greg Monroe (7)
| Will Bynum (6)
| The Palace of Auburn Hills16,072
| 23-46
|- style="background:#fcc;"							
| 70 || March 22 || @ Miami	
|  
| Greg Monroe (23)
| Greg Monroe (15)
| José Calderón (7)
| American Airlines Arena20,350 
| 23-47
|- style="background:#cfc;"						
| 71 || March 23 || @ Charlotte
|  
| Charlie Villanueva (18)
| Greg Monroe (9)
| Greg Monroe (8)
| Time Warner Cable Arena16,375 
| 24-47
|- style="background:#fcc;"								
| 72 || March 26 || Minnesota
|  
| José Calderón (14)
| Greg Monroe (12)
| Charlie Villanueva (4)
| The Palace of Auburn Hills16,877
| 24-48
|- style="background:#fcc;"								
| 73 || March 29 || Toronto
|  
| Jonas Jerebko (20)
| Greg Monroe (13)
| José Calderón (7)
| The Palace of Auburn Hills19,322 
| 24-49
|- style="background:#fcc;"							
| 74 || March 31 || @ Chicago
|  
| Rodney Stuckey (25)
| Andre Drummond (14)
| José Calderón (5)
| United Center21,864
| 24-50
				
|- style="background:#cfc;"							
| 75 || April 1 || @ Toronto
|  
| Greg Monroe (24)
| Jonas Jerebko (6)
| José Calderón (9)
| Air Canada Centre21,864
| 25-50							
|- style="background:#fcc;"								
| 76 || April 3 || @ Boston
| 
| Greg Monroe (24)
| Greg Monroe (17)
| Charlie Villanueva (5)
| TD Garden18,624 
| 25-51
|- style="background:#fcc;"								
| 77 || April 6 || @ Minnesota
|  
| Brandon Knight (25)
| Andre Drummond (10)
| Brandon Knight (6)
| Target Center15,311 
| 25-52
|- style="background:#cfc;"								
| 78 || April 7 || Chicago		
|  
| Brandon Knight (20)
| Andre Drummond (10)
| Greg Monroe (7)
| The Palace of Auburn Hills19,577 
| 26-52
|- style="background:#cfc;"					
| 79 || April 10 || @ Cleveland
|  
| Andre Drummond (29)
| Andre Drummond (11)
| Rodney Stuckey (7)
| Quicken Loans Arena13,844 
| 27-52
|- style="background:#cfc;"								
| 80 || April 12 || Charlotte
| 
| Jonas Jerebko (21)
| Andre Drummond (9)
| Will Bynum (10)
| The Palace of Auburn Hills19,501 
| 28-52
|- style="background:#cfc;"							
| 81 || April 15 || Philadelphia
| 
| Greg Monroe (27)
| Greg Monroe (16)
| Rodney Stuckey (6)
| The Palace of Auburn Hills17,525 
| 29-52
|- style="background:#fcc;"								
| 82 || April 17 || @ Brooklyn
| 
| Will Bynum (23)
| Greg Monroe (12)
| Brandon Knight (5)
| Barclays Center16,868 
| 29-53

Standings

Player statistics

Season

|- align="center" bgcolor=""
| 
| 81 ||style="background:#eb003c;color:white;" |81 || style="background:#eb003c;color:white;" |33.2 || .486 || .000 || .689 ||style="background:#eb003c;color:white;" |9.6 || 3.5 ||style="background:#eb003c;color:white;" |1.3 || .68 ||style="background:#eb003c;color:white;" |16.0
|- align="center" bgcolor="f0f0f0"
| 
| 75 || 75 || 31.5 || .407 || .367 || .733 || 3.3 || 4.0 || .77 || .11 || 13.3
|- align="center" bgcolor=""
| 
| 28 || 28 || 31.7 || .527 || style="background:#eb003c;color:white;" |.520 || style="background:#eb003c;color:white;" |.893 || 2.5 || style="background:#eb003c;color:white;" |6.6 || 1.07 || .07 || 11.6
|- align="center" bgcolor="f0f0f0"
| 
| 76 || 24 || 28.6 || .406 || .302 || .783 || 2.8 || 3.6 || .67 || .22 || 11.5
|- align="center" bgcolor=""
| 
| 65 || 0 || 18.8 || .469 || .316 || .809 || 1.5 || 3.6 || .69 || .08 || 9.8
|- align="center" bgcolor="f0f0f0"
| 
|style="background:#eb003c;color:white;" |82 || 74 || 28.0 || .428 || .350 || .806 || 4.0 || 0.9 || .7 || .45 || 8.8
|- align="center" bgcolor=""
| 
| 66 || 10 || 20.7 || .608 || .500 || .371 || 7.6 || .5 || .98 || style="background:#eb003c;color:white;" |1.58 || 7.9
|- align="center" bgcolor="f0f0f0"
| 
| 49 || 2 || 18.2 || .449 || .301 || .773 || 3.8 || .9 || .78 || .16 || 7.7
|- align="center" bgcolor=""
| 
| 72 || 71 || 24.8 || .446 || .000 || .621 || 5.7 || .8 || .44 || 1.32 || 6.9
|- align="center" bgcolor="f0f0f0"
| 
| 69 || 0 || 15.8 || .377 || .347 || .551 || 3.5 || .8 || .45 || .57 || 6.8
|- align="center" bgcolor=""
| 
| 27 || 0 || 17.6 || .440 || .311 || .844 || 1.9 || 1.0 || .56 || .15 || 6.1
|- align="center" bgcolor="f0f0f0"
| 
| 18 || 0 || 14.3 || .355 || .238 || .750 || 1.4 || 1.1 || .33 || .11 || 5.3
|- align="center" bgcolor=""
| 
| 25 || 0 || 9.0 || style="background:#eb003c;color:white;" |.717 || .000 || .297 || 1.8 || .4 || .20 || .36 || 3.1
|- align="center" bgcolor="f0f0f0"
| 
| 41 || 0 || 9.9 || .375 || .280 || .724 || .90 || .6 || .39 || .07 || 2.9
|}

Transactions

Overview

Trades

Free agents

References

Detroit Pistons seasons
Detroit Pistons
Detroit
Detroit